Taylor F. Thompson (born June 18, 1987) is an American former professional baseball pitcher. He previously played for the Chicago White Sox of Major League Baseball (MLB).

Career
Thompson played college baseball at Auburn University from 2007 to 2009. He was drafted by the Chicago White Sox in the 25th round of the 2008 Major League Baseball Draft, but did not sign and returned to Auburn.

Chicago White Sox
He was then drafted again by the White Sox in the 44th round of the 2009 Draft.

Thompson was called up to the majors for the first time on July 20, 2014 and made his Major League debut that same day against the Houston Astros pitching an inning and a third giving up one hit and striking out two.

Oakland Athletics
He was claimed off waivers by the Oakland Athletics on November 4, 2014. He was designated for assignment on August 14, 2015, after spending much of the season on the disabled list and making only eight minor league appearances. He was released prior to the 2016 season.

Bridgeport Bluefish
On April 12, 2016, Thompson signed with the Bridgeport Bluefish of the Atlantic League of Professional Baseball. He became a free agent after the 2016 season.

References

External links

Auburn Tigers bio

1987 births
Living people
Chicago White Sox players
Auburn Tigers baseball players
Bristol White Sox players
Charlotte Knights players
Great Falls Voyagers players
Kannapolis Intimidators players
Winston-Salem Dash players
Birmingham Barons players
Salt River Rafters players
Tiburones de La Guaira players
American expatriate baseball players in Venezuela
Major League Baseball pitchers
Baseball players from Montgomery, Alabama
Stockton Ports players
Nashville Sounds players
Bridgeport Bluefish players